The Mysterious Planet is the first serial of the larger narrative known as The Trial of a Time Lord which encompasses the whole of the 23rd season of the British science fiction television series Doctor Who. It was first broadcast in four weekly parts on BBC1 from 6 to 27 September 1986. The title The Mysterious Planet is not used on-screen and only appears in the serial's scripts with the four episodes that comprise the story being transmitted as The Trial of a Time Lord Parts One to Four.

In the serial, the Sixth Doctor (Colin Baker) is put on trial by his own people, the Time Lords, accused of meddling in the affairs of Earth far in the future, when it has been renamed Ravolox and relocated light years from its original location. Much of the story consists of video testimony presented by the prosecutor the Valeyard (Michael Jayston) of the Doctor attempting to stop the robot Drathro from causing an explosion that would threaten the entire universe.

Plot

Events of the serial are framed on an arcing plot that carries through the other three serials of the 23rd season. In this, the Sixth Doctor is forced to land the TARDIS aboard a Gallifreyan space station, where he is brought into a courtroom. The Inquisitor informs the Doctor he is on trial for conduct unbecoming a Time Lord; evidence will be presented by the Valeyard. The first evidence is shown through video footage, taken from the Matrix, of the Doctor's recent involvement in the planet Ravolox, where the Valeyard shows that the Doctor willingly became involved in the affairs of the planet. The Doctor denies these charges as the Valeyard brings them. After showing the video, the Valeyard affirms he has more evidence sufficient to call for the end of the Doctor's life.

As shown by the court evidence, the Doctor and Peri land on Ravolox, both noting a similarity to Earth. The Doctor is aware that Ravolox was devastated by a fireball, according to official records, but the presence of flourishing plant life makes him suspicious. As they walk, they are observed by Sabalom Glitz and Dibber, mercenaries on the planet attempting to destroy a "black light" generator in order to destroy the L3 robot deep underground that it powers. The Doctor and Peri find a tunnel and enter to find remains that appear to be that of the Marble Arch tube station on the London Underground Central line, piquing the Doctor's curiosity further. The Doctor wishes to proceed deeper, but Peri is worried and stays behind.

Peri is soon captured by a local human tribe, led by Katryca, and brought to their camp. Katryca informs Peri that she will need to take many husbands for the tribe, and locks her away with Glitz and Dibber; the two were captured after approaching the tribe to try to convince them to let them destroy the generator, which the tribe has taken as a totem. The three manage to overpower the guards and escape, but not before planting a bomb on the black light generator. They are pursued by the tribe.

The Doctor, in exploring the modern underground complex, is also captured by humans under watch by "the Immortal". He is brought before the Immortal, the L3 robot that Glitz is looking for. The robot calls itself Drathro, and is following its instructions to maintain the habitat of the underground system. Drathro orders the Doctor to make necessary repairs, but the Doctor manages to temporarily electrify the robot and make his escape. Drathro sends a service robot after the Doctor.

Peri, Glitz, and Dibber eventually meet up with the Doctor back at the ruins of Marble Arch, trapped between the tribe and the service robot. However, the tribesmen disable the service robot and recapture the group including the Doctor. The Doctor tries to explain the nature of the tribe's totem, but Katryca is unimpressed and places them in a cell again. While there, Glitz confirms that Ravolox is actually Earth. Drathro reactivates the service robot and sends it into the tribe's village to recapture the Doctor, but the tribe is able to disable it again; Katryca decides they should attack Drathro's "castle" to steal its technology for themselves. The Doctor and Peri use the opportunity to escape and re-enter the underground complex, aware that the black light generator is now damaged beyond repair, and if it should self-destruct, it could take the whole universe with it.

Katryca and the tribe are easily defeated by Drathro. When the Doctor arrives, he attempts to plead for Drathro to shut himself down in order to disable the black light system, but Drathro refuses. Glitz, Dibber and Peri arrive after being detained by Drathro, and Glitz offers to take the robot aboard his ship, which has a functioning black light system. Drathro agrees, and departs with the mercenaries. The Doctor finds the black light system is already beginning to self-destruct, and reconfigures the system so that its explosion would be limited to the underground complex. The Doctor, Peri, and the other humans living underground escape in time. The remains of the tribe offer to take in those humans that were living underground, and the Doctor and Peri say their goodbyes.

Production

Preproduction
In February 1985, the BBC announced that the planned twenty-third season of Doctor Who had been cancelled. After vocal protests by the press and Doctor Who fans (including a charity single, "Doctor in Distress"), the BBC announced that the programme was merely on "hiatus", and would return in September 1986.  Several stories which had been planned or commissioned for the original Season 23 were abandoned in favour of an overarching "trial" theme, reflecting the fact that the programme itself was on trial at the BBC.

This story was the last complete Doctor Who story written by Robert Holmes. Its plot is similar to Holmes' first contribution to Doctor Who, The Krotons. In both stories, an alien machine subjugates a humanoid civilisation and forces its brightest young people into its service.

Production
The opening model shot of the Time Lord Space Station where the trial is held throughout the season was the most expensive model shot from the classic series run (costing more than £8,000). The sequence depicts the Time Lord Space Station orbiting in space then dragging the TARDIS inside via the use of a tractor beam.

From this serial until the end of the show in 1989, all location work would be recorded on Outside Broadcast (OB) tape instead of the usual 16mm film. The only footage shot on film for this episode was the opening special effects shot of the TARDIS. The BBC had been encouraging the replacement of film cameras with OB cameras since the early 1980s on the grounds that they were cheaper, and mixed with studio-shot material better. John Nathan-Turner had actually wanted to switch to OB shooting as early as Peter Davison's first season in 1982, but met with resistance from the directors working on the show at the time, so was overruled.

Roger Brierley, who voiced the role of Drathro, was originally supposed to wear the robot costume and physically play the role, but it was realised that the costume would not fit Brierley's  frame. Therefore, a special effects assistant, Paul McGuinness, who helped design the costume, was called in to physically play Drathro, while Brierley spoke his lines from off-camera.

Post-production
Dominic Glynn was hired to score the incidental music for The Mysterious Planet, then John Nathan-Turner offered him the chance to rearrange the opening title music. His new score for the opening theme was the shortest-lived, lasting for this season alone (not counting the unused 1973 version by Delia Derbyshire and Paddy Kingsland).

Cast notes
The actor playing Merdeen, Tom Chadbon, had previously appeared in the 1979 Fourth Doctor serial City of Death.

Reception
The serial generally receives a poor response, similar to the other stories of this era. Patrick Mulkern of Radio Times was critical of the serial: "a dismal last gasp from ailing writer Robert Holmes. The travails of the Saxon-like Tribe of the Free and whey-faced tunnel-dwellers are totally unengaging. Lifeless characters, clumsy robots, flimsy cliffhangers, zero peril."
AV Club's Christopher Bahn said: "'Mysterious Planet' never really takes off, laden down by the script, a lot of time wasted running around in the forest or down corridors, and some atrocious acting by some of the minor characters, particularly Joan Sims as Katryca, the Boadica-esque warrior queen who sounds like she's escaped from a community-theater Shakespeare in the Park production."

Commercial releases

In print

A novelisation of this serial, written by Terrance Dicks, was published by Target Books in November 1987.

Home media
In October 1993, this story was released on VHS as part of the three-tape The Trial of a Time Lord set. It was released on DVD on 29 September 2008, similarly boxed with the other three stories of this season. This serial was also released as part of the Doctor Who DVD Files in Issue 129 on 11 December 2013.

These four episodes, along with the remaining 10 episodes, were released on blu-ray on October 7 2019. Extended versions of these four episodes (along with extended versions of the remaining 10 episodes) were included as extras on Discs 5 & 6.

References

External links

Target novelisation

On Target – The Mysterious Planet

Sixth Doctor serials
Doctor Who serials novelised by Terrance Dicks
1986 British television episodes
Fiction set in the 7th millennium or beyond